Yaron Oz  is a former Israeli footballer. He spent his professional career with Maccabi Tel Aviv F.C.,  as well as playing for the Israel National team.

References

External links
 
 

1952 births
Living people
Israeli footballers
Maccabi Tel Aviv F.C. players
Maccabi Jaffa F.C. players
Liga Leumit players
Israel international footballers
Olympic footballers of Israel
Footballers at the 1976 Summer Olympics
Association football midfielders